Amerigo Corsanego was an Italian wrestler. He competed in the Greco-Roman middleweight event at the 1920 Summer Olympics.

References

External links
 

Year of birth missing
Year of death missing
Olympic wrestlers of Italy
Wrestlers at the 1920 Summer Olympics
Italian male sport wrestlers
Place of birth missing